Bartenheim station (French: Gare de Bartenheim) is a railway station on the Strasbourg–Basel railway serving the commuter town of Bartenheim, Alsace, France. The station is served by regional trains to Mulhouse and Basel.

References

Railway stations in Haut-Rhin